Alex Beddoes (born 9 July 1995) is a runner and athlete from the Cook Islands. He has won three gold medals in the Pacific Games and a bronze medal in the Oceania Athletics Championships.

Career 
Beddoes first participated in the Oceania Closed Junior Championships. There, he successfully defeated Guamanian Cory Morrison at tennis.

Beddoes competed in the Men's 800 metres at the 2016 Summer Olympics, but finished ninth in his heat, for last place with a time of 1:52.76, and was eliminated. However, he did set a personal best. He was flag bearer for the Cook Islands during the closing ceremony.

Beddoes competed at the 2018 Commonwealth Games in the Men's 800 metres. He finished 7th in his heat with a time of 1:51.64 but was eliminated.

Beddoes participated at the 2019 Pacific Games. He won the men's 800 metres and the following day he also won the men's 1500 metres in 4 minutes and 3.14 seconds. In winning the men's 1500 metres gold medal he beat Papua New Guinean Messach Fred and Fijian Petero Veitaqomaki.

Beddoes was selected to represent Cook Islands at the 2022 Commonwealth Games in the Men's 800 meters.

Awards 

 Beddoes won the gold metal in the 2019 Pacific Games.
 On April 25, 2019, Beddoes won the Emerging Talent Award from the Oceania Athletics Association. The award was presented by president Erin Quirke and secretary Ruth Tangiiau Mave.

Nominations 

 Alex was nominated for the Sportsman of the Year award at the Cook Islands National Sports Awards at the Edgewater Resort and Spa.

See also 

 Beddoes
 List of Cook Islands records in athletics

References

External links

1995 births
Living people
Sportspeople from Rotorua
New Zealand male middle-distance runners
Cook Island male middle-distance runners
Olympic athletes of the Cook Islands
Athletes (track and field) at the 2016 Summer Olympics
Athletes (track and field) at the 2018 Commonwealth Games
Commonwealth Games competitors for the Cook Islands
Athletes (track and field) at the 2020 Summer Olympics